The 1909 Paris–Tours was the sixth edition of the Paris–Tours cycle race and was held on 26 September 1909. The race started in Paris and finished in Tours. The race was won by François Faber.

General classification

References

1909 in French sport
1909
September 1909 sports events